The 1992 Jordan International Tournament was an international friendly soccer tournament . Matches were held in Amman and Arbid, held from 18–28 August 1992.

Participants 
  Congo
  ES Setif
  Ethiopia
  Iraq
  Jordan
  Moldova
  Pakistan
  Sudan

Group stage

Group A

Group B

Knockout stage

Semifinals

Third place play-off

Final

Awards

Statistics

Goalscorers

Hat-tricks

References

2000